MV Lady Mary Joy 3 is a passenger ferry owned and operated by Aleson Shipping Lines. She's the former MV Daito acquired by Aleson Shipping in July 2011.

Career 
By the time she was commissioned for Aleson Shipping Lines, she became the regular ferry for Zamboanga City to Jolo, Sulu.

Following the incident of MV Danica Joy last September 22, 2016, the Philippine Embassy in Malaysia demanded an alternative transport for Sandakan, Malaysia to Zamboanga City knowing that the number of Filipino deportees in Sabah, Malaysia was gone to 7000. At that time, MV Danica Joy was the lone ferry to cater the Zamboanga City - Sandakan route and the operator, Aleson Shipping Lines was suspended for a month to operate the said route. When the suspension was lifted in November 2016, MV Lady Mary Joy 3 was temporarily assigned to ferry the deportees back to the Philippines while MV Kristel Jane 2 took the Zamboanga City - Jolo route.

References

External links 
 Official website
 MV Lady Mary Joy 3 Specs - Maritime Connector
 MV Lady Mary Joy 3 Specs - Shipsinfo

1990 ships
Ships built in Japan
Ferries of the Philippines
Ships of the Philippines